Intelsat 28, formerly New Dawn, is a communications satellite operated by Intelsat, and positioned in geosynchronous orbit at 33 degrees east, serving TV and broadband communications to Africa. 

Intelsat 28 was built by Orbital Sciences Corporation, and is based on the STAR-2 satellite platform. Following its launch in 2011, one of its antennas failed to deploy, prevented use of part of the C-band payload, limiting the spacecraft's operational lifespan.

References

External links

 Intelsat New Dawn 

Spacecraft launched in 2011
Communications satellites in geostationary orbit
Intelsat satellites
Ariane commercial payloads
Satellites using the GEOStar bus